Hugh Alexander (Alex) Carruthers  (December 2, 1906 – November 18, 1977) was a Canadian politician, who represented Durham in the Legislative Assembly of Ontario from 1959 to 1975 as a Progressive Conservative member.

Alex Carruthers was born in Lambton County to Hugh R. Carruthers and Dyell Amelia Levina. Prior to his election, he worked at CCM bicycles, in Weston, Ontario.  He was principal of Hawkins Senior Public School in Port Hope, Ontario.

References

External links

1906 births
1977 deaths
Progressive Conservative Party of Ontario MPPs